The South Zone (Portuguese: Zona Sul - ) is an area of the city of Rio de Janeiro situated between the Tijuca Massif, the Atlantic Ocean and Guanabara Bay. Most of it is made up of neighborhoods along the Atlantic coastline, such as São Conrado, Vidigal, Leblon, Ipanema, Copacabana, and Leme.

It also includes the neighborhoods of Urca, Botafogo, Flamengo and Glória, on Guanabara Bay, and Santa Teresa, Catete, Laranjeiras, Cosme Velho, Humaitá, Lagoa, Jardim Botânico and Gávea, bordering on Tijuca Forest to the West or North. Zona Sul includes a number of favelas, such as Rocinha, close to São Conrado, Vidigal, close to Leblon, Cantagalo and Ladeira dos Tabajaras, in Copacabana, and Morro Dona Marta, in Botafogo.

It is in this region that the majority of the city's balneario beaches and hotels are located, as are the Rodrigo de Freitas Lagoon, much of the Tijuca National Park, the Sugarloaf Mountain, with its cable car, the Corcovado hill, where the statue of Christ the Redeemer stands, and other natural wonders and tourist attractions. It is the richest region of the city and is visited by thousands of tourists from different parts of the world throughout the year.

List of neighborhoods 

Arpoador
Botafogo
Catete
Copacabana
Cosme Velho
Flamengo
Gávea
Glória
Humaitá
Ipanema
Jardim Botanico
Lagoa
Laranjeiras
Leblon
Leme
Santa Teresa
São Conrado
Urca

References

Neighbourhoods in Rio de Janeiro (city)